The 2015 Sparkassen Open was a professional tennis tournament played on clay courts. It was the 22nd edition of the tournament which was part of the 2015 ATP Challenger Tour. It took place in Braunschweig, Germany between 6 and 11 July 2015.

Singles main-draw entrants

Seeds

 1 Rankings are as of June 29, 2015.

Other entrants
The following players received wildcards into the singles main draw:
  Florian Mayer
  Mischa Zverev
  Maximilian Marterer
  Daniel Brands

The following players received entry as a special exempt into the singles main draw:
  Nils Langer

The following players received entry with a protected ranking:
  Pere Riba

The following players received entry as an alternate into the singles main draw:
  Gastão Elias

The following players received entry from the qualifying draw:
  Rogério Dutra Silva
  Dimitar Kuzmanov
  Jason Kubler
  Karen Khachanov

Doubles main-draw entrants

Seeds

1 Rankings as of June 29, 2015.

Other entrants
The following pairs received wildcards into the doubles main draw:
  Alexander Zverev /  Mischa Zverev
  Simon Stadler /  Jan-Lennard Struff
  Nils Langer /  Maximilian Marterer

Champions

Singles

  Filip Krajinović def.  Paul-Henri Mathieu 6–2, 6–4

Doubles

  Sergey Betov /  Michail Elgin def.  Damir Džumhur /  Franko Škugor, 3–6, 6–1, [10–5]

External links
Official Website

Sparkassen Open
Sparkassen Open
2015 in German tennis